

Fiera Milano SpA
Fiera Milano SpA is a trade fair and exhibition organiser headquartered in Milan. The firm is the most important trade fair organiser in Italy and one of the largest in the world.

The company started operation on 1 October 2000 and has been listed on Borsa Italiana (STAR segment) since 12 December 2002.

Fiera Milano mainly operates in the fields of management and organisation of exhibitions, trade fairs and conferences. It hosts about seventy shows (of which about one third directly organized) and 30,000 exhibitors every year.

Fieramilanocity

FieraMilano 

Fieramilano, opened in 2005,  is a fairground complex designed by architect Massimiliano Fuksas, located in an area on the border between the towns of Rho and Pero.

MiCo
MiCo (Milano Congressi) is currently the largest congress center in Europe, with a capacity of up to 18,000 in 70 different conference rooms.

References

External links

FieraMilano official site
FieraMilano Congress official site
Expopage Fiera Milano - Online exhibitors catalogues of Fiera Milano's tradeshows

2000 establishments in Italy
Event management companies of Italy
Economy of Milan
Trade fairs in Italy
Convention centers in Italy
World's fair sites in Milan